Hortonia angustifolia is a species of plant in the Monimiaceae family. It is endemic to Sri Lanka.

Leaves
Linear-lanceolate, pointed ends, faintly 3-veined at base.

Trunk
Branches slender.

Flowers
Pale yellow, slender, drooping; Inflorescence - racemes with few flowers.

Fruits
Dark crimson, ovoid, compressed, obliquely pointed, pulpy.

Ecology
Rain forests near waterways.

References

Flora of Sri Lanka
Monimiaceae
Critically endangered plants
Taxonomy articles created by Polbot